Martinic may refer to:

 Martinic family, Bohemian nobility
 Martinić, Croatian surname
 Martinich, surname
 Martinice, places in the Czech Republic
 Martinican, a demonym of the island Martinique